Peter Keetman (April 27, 1916 – March 8, 2005) was a German photographer.

Life and career 
Peter Keetman was born in 1916 in Elberfeld. He was part of a very wealthy family and his father Alfred Keetman was bank director of the banking house J. Wichelhaus P. Sohn.<ref>[http://www.heidermanns.net/gen-pers.php?ID=62487-62488 Genealogical Researches''']</ref> Peter Keetman lived with his wife Esa in Prien, Breitbrunn and Marquartstein in Chiemgau (Upper Bavaria).  

From 1935 to 1937 Keetman attended the Bayerische Staatslehranstalt für Lichtbildwesen (later called: Staatliche Fachakademie für Fotodesign Münch]). After graduating he became assistant to industrial and portrait photographer Gertrud Hesse in Duisburg and to industrial photographer Carl Heinz Schmeck in Aachen. In 1940 he was called up as a railway pioneer and returned from the war in 1944 seriously injured. From 1947 to 1948 he attended the master class of the Bayerische Staatslehranstalt für Lichtbildwesen. In 1948 he assisted Adolf Lazi with the planning and realization of the exhibition Die Photographie 1948 in the Landesgewerbemuseum Stuttgart.

In 1949 Keetman was a founding member of the avant-garde photography group fotoform and played a decisive role in determining the direction there so called subjective photography took. In the exhibition Subjective Photography put together by Otto Steinert in 1951 and in the accompanying photobook, Keetman's works have a formative role. From 1948, Keetman was represented with pictures in all major German and some international photo magazines. His work series Eine Woche im Volkswagenwerk (Volkswagen: A week at the Factory), which he photographed in 1953 in Wolfsburg, became particularly well known. His pictures of assembly line technology, car body parts and technical details of the Volkswagen Beetle were revolutionary, graphically designed photography through cropping and perspective.

The Museum Folkwang and the F. C. Gundlach Foundation dedicated a comprehensive retrospective to the photographer in 2016 on the occasion of his 100th birthday under the title Peter Keetman. Gestaltete Welt (Peter Keetman. Shaping the World).

 Selected exhibitions 
 Peter Keetman, Staatliche Landesbildstelle, Hamburg 1961
 fotoform. Peter Keetman, Kicken, Cologne 1980
 Peter Keetman. Photographien, PPS Galerie F.C. Gundlach, Hamburg 1982
 Fotografien von Peter Keetman, Fotografie Forum, Frankfurt 1989
 Peter Keetman. Fotografien 1937–1987, Fotomuseum im Stadtmuseum, Munich 1991
 Peter Keetman. Fotografien, Von der Heydt-Museum, Wuppertal 1994
 Peter Keetman and fotoform, Howard Greenberg Gallery, New York 1995
 Peter Keetman. Bilder aus dem 1995 erworbenen Archiv, Museum Folkwang, Essen 1996
 Peter Keetman. Volkswagenwerk 1953, Kunstmuseum Wolfsburg 2003
 Peter Keetman, Kicken, Berlin 2006
 Peter Keetman. Gestaltete Welt, Museum Folkwang, Essen 2016
 Peter Keetman. Gestaltete Welt, Haus der Photographie – Deichtorhallen, Hamburg 2016
 Peter Keetman. Gestaltete Welt, Kunstfoyer, Munich 2017

Selected bibliography 
 München. Lebenskreise einer Stadt, Jan Thorbecke Verlag, Lindau 1955
 Ute Eskildsen (Hrsg.): Subjektive Fotografie – Bilder der 50er Jahre, Folkwang Verlag, Essen 1984
 Eine Woche im Volkswagenwerk. Fotografien aus dem April 1953, Nishen, Berlin 1985, 
 F. C. Gundlach (Hrsg.): fotoform / Peter Keetman, Nishen, Berlin 1988, 
 Volkswagen: A Week at the Factory, Chronicle Books, San Francisco 1992, 
 Manfred Heiting (Hrsg.): Peter Keetman. Bewegung und Struktur, Cinubia, Amsterdam 1996, 
 Gijs van Tuyl (Hrsg.): Peter Keetman: "Volkswagenwerk 1953", Kerber Verlag, Bielefeld 2003, 
 F. C. Gundlach (Hrsg.): Peter Keetman – Gestaltete Welt. Steidl, Göttingen 2016,  (including extensive biographical and bibliographical information)

Awards 
 1981 David-Octavius-Hill-Medaille
 1991 Kulturpreis der Deutschen Gesellschaft für Photographie

Literature 
 Angelika Bredemeyer: Der Photograph Peter Keetman, Bonn 1992

References

Sources
 The Peter Keetman Archive in the F. C. Gundlach Foundation
 Information on Peter Keetman in the Deutschen Fotothek
 
 Fotos wie cool Jazz, Die ZEIT vom 30 June 2016
 Peter Keetman. Biography, Exhibitions, Awards, Museum Folkwang (.pdf)

20th-century German photographers
Photographers from North Rhine-Westphalia
1916 births
2005 deaths
People from Elberfeld
Artists from Wuppertal